

The INTA HM.1, also known as Huarte Mendicoa HM-1, was a 1940s Spanish primary trainer designed by the Instituto Nacional de Técnica Aeronáutica (INTA) and built for them by Aeronáutica Industrial S.A. (AISA).

Development
The HM.1 was designed by INTA as a two-seat primary training monoplane with a fixed tailwheel landing gear. It was followed by a number of similar aircraft with equipment and accommodation changes. The last of the family was the HM.7 built in 1947 which was an enlarged four-seat version powered by a 240 hp (179 kW) Argus As 10C engine, the HM.7 was the last powered aircraft designed by the Institute.

Variants
HM.1
Two-seat primary trainer
HM.2
enclosed-cabin version of the HM.1 with retractable landing gear.
HM.3
open-cockpit floatplane variant
HM.5
single-seat advanced trainer
HM.7
enlarged four-seat version
HM.9
two-seat glider tug

Operators

Spanish Air Force

Specification HM.1

References

Notes

Bibliography

External links

1940s Spanish civil utility aircraft
Low-wing aircraft
Single-engined tractor aircraft
Aircraft first flown in 1943